Coahoma may refer to:

Coahoma, Mississippi
Coahoma, Texas
Coahoma County